Tzeltalia is a genus of flowering plants belonging to the family Solanaceae.

Its native range is Guatemala and North America.

Species:
 Tzeltalia amphitricha (Bitter) E.Estrada & M.Martínez 
 Tzeltalia calidaria (Standl. & Steyerm.) E.Estrada & M.Martínez 
 Tzeltalia esenbeckii M.Martínez & O.Vargas

References

Physaleae
Solanaceae genera